Rho Telescopii (ρ Tel, ρ Telescopii) is the Bayer designation for an astrometric binary star system in the southern constellation of Telescopium. It is visible to the naked eye, with an apparent visual magnitude of +5.17. Based upon an annual parallax shift of 17.63 mas as measured from Earth, it is located approximately 185 light years from the Sun.

This appears to be a single-lined spectroscopic binary as it displays radial velocity variation with a period of 1.7 days.

It may be a member of the Tucana-Horologium association.

References

F-type main-sequence stars
Astrometric binaries
Telescopii, Rho
Telescopium (constellation)
Durchmusterung objects
177171
093815
7213